Roopawas is a village in Pali district, Rajasthan state, India.

Notable people 

 Kesri Singh Mundiyar

Villages in Pali district